Pia Hansen (born 25 September 1965) is a Swedish sport shooter. She originally competed in Nordic Trap but then moved on to Olympic trap and double trap. She won the latter at the 2000 Olympics in Sydney, and she also finished eighth in trap. In Athens four years later, she finished ninth in both events.

External links 
 Hansen's profile at ISSF

1965 births
Living people
Swedish female sport shooters
Olympic shooters of Sweden
Trap and double trap shooters
Olympic medalists in shooting

Medalists at the 2000 Summer Olympics
Olympic gold medalists for Sweden
Shooters at the 2000 Summer Olympics
Shooters at the 2004 Summer Olympics
20th-century Swedish women
21st-century Swedish women